Kim Yeon-man (born 1 June 1963) is a South Korean wrestler. He competed in the men's freestyle 62 kg at the 1988 Summer Olympics.

References

External links
 

1963 births
Living people
South Korean male sport wrestlers
Olympic wrestlers of South Korea
Wrestlers at the 1988 Summer Olympics
Place of birth missing (living people)
20th-century South Korean people